Márton Lõrincz (28 October 1911 – 1 August 1969) was a Hungarian wrestler and Olympic champion in Greco-Roman wrestling. He was born in Korond and died in Buenos Aires, Argentina.

Olympics
Lõrincz competed at the 1936 Summer Olympics in Berlin where he received a gold medal in Greco-Roman wrestling, the bantamweight class.

References

External links
 

1911 births
1969 deaths
Olympic wrestlers of Hungary
Wrestlers at the 1936 Summer Olympics
Hungarian male sport wrestlers
Olympic gold medalists for Hungary
Olympic medalists in wrestling
Medalists at the 1936 Summer Olympics
20th-century Hungarian people